In the 1921 Tour de France, two veteran cyclists who joined the race were Ernest Paul and Lucien Pothier, both forty years old. Paul rode his first Tour de France in 1908, while Pothier had started in the first Tour de France in 1903, and finished second.
The winner of 1920, Philippe Thys, was the dominant stage racer of the time, but he was recovering from an illness and could not compete for the victory.

The economic impact of World War I was still not over, so as in the previous years there were not sponsored teams, but the cycling companies had bundled their forces under the nick La Sportive. The cyclists were divided in two categories, this time named 1ère class (first class), the professionals, and 2ème classe (second class), the amateurs. This year, some of the second class cyclists would finish higher than some of the first class cyclists.

The 1921 Tour de France saw the introduction of foreign press. They followed the race in their own cars.
For the first time, an inhabitant from Monaco joined the Tour de France. Laurent Devalle needed more than twenty-seven hours for the fifth stage, and would finally give up in the eleventh stage.

By starting number

By nationality

References

External links
 1921 start list at Cycling Archives

1921 Tour de France
1921